Cryoglobulinemic vasculitis is a form of inflammation affecting the blood vessels caused by the deposition of abnormal proteins called cryoglobulins. These immunoglobulin proteins are soluble at normal body temperatures, but become insoluble below 37 °C (98.6 °F) and subsequently may aggregate within smaller blood vessels. Inflammation within these obstructed blood vessels is due to the deposition of complement proteins which activate inflammatory pathways.

Cryoglobulinemic vasculitis most commonly affect the skin, causing a raised, pinpoint rash on the lower extremities known as purpura. The kidneys may additionally be affected by this form of vasculitis, resulting in membranoproliferative glomerulonephritis. Fevers, painful muscles and joints, and peripheral nerve damage are other common manifestations of cryoglobulinemic vasculitis.

Epidemiology 
The incidence of cryoglobulinemic vasculitis is low and highly corresponds to the presence of hepatitis C virus infection, with increased prevalence in Southern Europe. Only about 30% of individuals with cryoglobulinemia develop vasculitis and associated symptoms. In a review of 279 patients, the average age of patients with symptomatic disease associated with hepatitis C virus was 54 years old, with an equal distribution between men and women.

Pathophysiology 
Cryoglobulinemia is currently classified by the type of immunoglobulin, IgM or IgG, present in blood as well as whether the immunoglobulin is monoclonal or polyclonal. Type II cryoglobulinemia, is defined as a mix of monoclonal IgM or polyclonal IgG, whereas type III cryoglobulinemia is classified as IgM and IgG that are both polyclonal only. The immunoglobulins in either cryoglobulinemia type have rheumatoid factor activity, allowing binding of the Fc subunit of IgM to IgG which has the capacity to activate complement proteins and deposit in the endothelium of small and medium-sized blood vessels.

In contrast, type I cryoglobulinemia causes damage solely due to hyperviscosity syndrome, which refers to the aggregation and resulting obstructing nature of cryoglobulins in blood vessels resulting in reduced perfusion of tissues and possibly necrosis if prolonged. Therefore, vasculitis generally occurs only in patients affected by mixed (type 2 and 3) cryoglobulinemia, as simple (type 1) cryoglobulinemia causes a hyperviscosity syndrome without complement activation.

The large majority of cases of cryogloulinemic vasculitis are associated with underlying medical conditions which contribute to or exacerbate the pathophysiology, the most common being hepatitis C virus infection. There are a number of other rheumatologic, oncologic, inflammatory, and infectious associations including Sjogren's syndrome, B-cell lymphoma, rheumatoid arthritis, systemic lupus erythematous, and other hepatitis viral infections. Type III cryoglobulinemia is most associated with autoimmune conditions.

Manifestations 
At least 50% of patients with cryoglobulinemic vasculitis have only mild symptoms. More severe symptoms involve renal, gastrointestinal, and neurological damage with cardiovascular and respiratory complications presenting more rarely in a population of 279 patients with cryoglobulins and hepatitis C infection. Prevalence of these symptoms may vary depending on the underlying etiology contributing to the cryoglobulinemia.

Only about 5-10% of patients with cryoglobulins found in the bloodstream due to Hepatitis C virus develop symptoms. Approximately 20-40% of individuals with symptomatic cryoglobulinemic vasculitis eventually develop renal damage, usually years following initial diagnosis.

Diagnosis 
The first step in quantitative assessment entails identification of the presence of cryoglobulins in the bloodstream, which can be a technically involved and inaccurate process with a high proportion of false-positives and false-negatives. Test tubes should be warmed to normal body temperature at 37 °C prior to collection of blood samples, which are centrifuged after the blood coagulates. This sample is then stored at reduced temperatures of 4 °C for a week. If present, cryoglobulins will form precipitate during this time and be visible as a white sedimented layer. If rewarmed from 4 °C to 37 °C, this precipitate will redissolve into the blood sample. Following centrifugation, the layer of cryoglobulins should be immunofixed and labeled to allow for classification of cryoglobulinemia type.

Other nonspecific inflammatory markers are often elevated, including C-reactive protein and erythrocyte sedimentation rate, but are not required for diagnosis. Baseline laboratory markers, including metabolic panels, urinalysis, and urine protein, should be obtained to trend renal function through progression of the disease and monitor for glomerulonephritis. Complement levels and rheumatoid factor activity should additionally be assessed given the pathophysiology of cryoglobulinemia.

Underlying inflammatory, infectious, and oncologic diseases should also be tested for as appropriate. Workup for viral RNA, autoantibodies, and malignant serological markers should be considered. Biopsy may be obtained to assess for immune complex deposition.

Treatment 
The treatment of cryoglobulinemic vasculitis includes both immune modulator therapy and treatment of any underlying medical conditions. Rituximab may also be used in conjunction with glucocorticoids to inhibit B-cell proliferation and therefore decrease cryoglobulin production, although risks include infection and anemia.

References 

Vascular-related cutaneous conditions